Nenad Pralija (born 11 December 1970) is a Croatian retired football midfielder, who most notably played for Hajduk Split and the Croatia national football team.

Club career
Pralija started his career at his hometown club RNK Split where he spent three years before moving to the local powerhouse Hajduk Split. In his first season at Hajduk, the club had a successful Champions League campaign and Pralija is still dearly remembered by Hajduk fans for his spectacular volley in the group stage game against Anderlecht which was unstoppable for the Belgian side's goalkeeper Filip de Wilde, even though Pralija played the whole game playing as a left back - a position he never played at before. His form kept improving in subsequent seasons, and he finished the 1995–96 season as the club's top scorer with 17 goals in 26 appearances. He instantly became Hajduk fans' favourite player and was awarded the Heart of Hajduk Award two years in a row, in 1995 and 1996.

After three successful years at Hajduk, Pralija moved to La Liga club Espanyol where he started off as a first-team regular under José Antonio Camacho, but soon fell out of the manager's favour so he returned to Hajduk for the second half of the 1998–99 season. After that he spent a year at Serie A club Reggina, before moving to the Israeli outfit Maccabi Haifa. At Maccabi Pralija had a very successful spell, playing alongside fellow Croat Đovani Roso and coached by Avram Grant. During this time he won two Israeli championships and played in the Champions League again, this time scoring against Bayer Leverkusen at BayArena. He is still regarded as one of the best Maccabi players of the early 2000s.

After Maccabi, he returned to Hajduk again in 2003. At first he was a first-team regular and even captained the team for a while, but soon after Niko Kranjčar and Ivan Leko came to the club his increasingly poor performances pushed him out of the squad. During the 2005–06 season winter break he quietly left the club and moved to the lower level minnows NK Trogir where he ended his playing career and six months later took over as the club's sports director. He oversaw the club's promotion to Druga HNL but resigned soon afterwards.

International career
He debuted for Croatia on 11 June 1995 against Ukraine, coming on as a substitute for Aljoša Asanović. He played a total of 11 games for the national side (and scored a single goal in a friendly versus Czech Republic), but failed to leave a deeper mark during Miroslav Blažević's reign. He was quoted as saying that he was "born in a wrong era, since it was impossible to win a place on the team which had the likes of players such as Aljoša Asanović, Zvonimir Boban and Robert Prosinečki." His last appearance for Croatia was on 12 June 1997 in the starting lineup of a friendly against Turkey, and was substituted by Miljenko Mumlek just after the hour mark.

Honours

Club
Hajduk Split
 Croatian First League: 1993–94, 1994–95, 2003–04, 2004–05
 Croatian Cup: 1994–95
 Croatian Super Cup: 1993, 1994, 2004, 2005

Maccabi Haifa
 Israeli Premier League: 2000–01, 2001–02
 Toto Cup: 2002–03

International
Croatia
 Hassan II Trophy: 1996

Individual
 Heart of Hajduk Award: 1995, 1996

References

External links
 
Nenad Pralija Interview published by Slobodna Dalmacija daily in 2003 
Profile of Nenad Pralija on Maccabi Haifa's official website 
Profile and statistics of Nenad Pralija on One.co.il 

1970 births
Living people
Footballers from Split, Croatia
Association football midfielders
Yugoslav footballers
Croatian footballers
Croatia under-21 international footballers
Croatia international footballers
RNK Split players
HNK Hajduk Split players
RCD Espanyol footballers
Reggina 1914 players
Maccabi Haifa F.C. players
HNK Trogir players
Croatian Football League players
La Liga players
Serie A players
Israeli Premier League players
Second Football League (Croatia) players
Croatian expatriate footballers
Expatriate footballers in Spain
Croatian expatriate sportspeople in Spain
Expatriate footballers in Italy
Croatian expatriate sportspeople in Italy
Expatriate footballers in Israel
Croatian expatriate sportspeople in Israel
HNK Hajduk Split non-playing staff